Aisha "Pinky" Cole (born December 8, 1987) is an American restaurateur. She is the owner and operator of Slutty Vegan, a plant-based burger restaurant chain in Atlanta, Georgia.

Early life and education 
Cole was born and raised in Baltimore. Her parents are Jamaican immigrants and Rastafarians; her mother Ichelle Cole is a musician in the reggae group Strykers' Posse. Her father served prison time for the first 20 years of her life and was then deported to Jamaica. Cole became a vegetarian in 2007, and a vegan in 2014.

Cole received her bachelor's degree from Clark Atlanta University. She was elected “Miss Clark Atlanta” in 2008 and is a member of Delta Sigma Theta sorority. After college, Cole moved first to Los Angeles to become an actress, and then to New York to work in television production.

Career 
Her first restaurant, Pinky’s Jamaican and American Restaurant, operated in Harlem for two years, until she shuttered it in 2016 after a grease fire. Cole moved back to Atlanta and worked as a casting director for programs such as Iyanla: Fix My Life.

Cole was inspired to create the vegan restaurant Slutty Vegan due to her own cravings for vegan junk food. All of Slutty Vegan's products are titled with some form of sexual connotation, including "One Night Stand," "Fussy Hussy," "Sloppy Toppy," and "Chick'N Head". In July 2018, Cole sold her first vegan burgers through delivery apps and opened a food truck in September of that year. In January 2019, she opened the first Slutty Vegan brick-and-mortar restaurant in the Westview neighborhood of Atlanta. 

In November 2022, Cole began a five-city tour to promote her new cookbook, Eat Plants, B*tch: 91 Vegan Recipes That Will Blow Your Meat-Loving Mind.

Personal life 
Cole's romantic partner is entrepreneur Derrick Hayes. Hayes is the owner of Big Dave's Cheesesteaks, a cheesesteak restaurant based in Atlanta. They have a daughter, D Ella (born 2022). The couple became engaged on July 2, 2022 at New Orleans'

Philanthropy 
Cole and fellow alumna Stacy Lee paid the tuition of 30 Clark Atlanta University seniors in September 2019.

In May 2022, Cole gifted an LLC to every graduating student at the Clark Atlanta University commencement ceremony.

Cole runs her own philanthropic organization, The Pinky Cole Foundation, which focuses on providing financial support and educational programs for children of color .

References

External links 
Pinky Cole on Instagram
Official website for Slutty Vegan

Living people
Women restaurateurs
Businesspeople from Baltimore
Clark Atlanta University alumni
American people of Jamaican descent
Delta Sigma Theta members
1987 births